The detailed list of human anatomical features.

Head
Eye
Ear
Nose
Nostril
Mouth
Lip
Philtrum
Jaw
Mandible
Gingiva
Tooth
Tongue
Throat
Adam's apple
Vertebral column
Arm
Elbow
Wrist
 Hand
Fingers
Thumb
Nails
Skin
Hair
Chest (roughly Thorax)
Breast Mammalia
Abdomen (roughly Stomach)
Sex organs
Penis (male)
Scrotum (male)
Vulva (female)
Leg
Thigh
Knee
Kneecap
Shinbone
Calf
Ankle
Foot
Toes

Joints

 Development of the joints
 Classification of joints
 The kind of movement admitted in joints
 Articulations of the trunk
 Articulations of the vertebral column
 Articulation of the atlas with the epistropheus or axis
 Articulations of the vertebral column with the cranium
 Articulation of the mandible
 Costovertebral articulations
 Sternocostal articulations
 Articulation of the manubrium and body of the sternum
 Articulation of the vertebral column with the pelvis
 Articulations of the pelvis
 Articulations of the upper extremity
 Sternoclavicular articulation
 Acromioclavicular articulation
 Humeral articulation or shoulder-joint
 Elbow-joint
 Radioulnar articulation
 Radiocarpal articulation or wrist-joint
 Intercarpal articulations
 Carpometacarpal articulations
 Intermetacarpal articulations
 Metacarpophalangeal articulations
 Articulations of the digits
 Articulations of the lower extremity
 Coxal articulation or hip-joint
 The knee-joint
 Articulations between the tibia and fibula
 Talocrural articulation or ankle-joint
 Intertarsal articulations
 Tarsometatarsal articulations
 Intermetatarsal articulations
 Metatarsophalangeal articulations
 Articulations of the digits
 Arches of the foot

Angiology 

 The blood
 Development of the vascular system
 The thoracic cavity
 The pericardium
 The heart
 Peculiarities in the vascular system in the fetus

Anatomical landmarks
On the trunk of the body, the chest is referred to as the thoracic area. The shoulder in general is the acromial, while the curve of the shoulder is the deltoid. The back as a general area is the dorsum or dorsal area, and the lower back as the lumbus or lumbar region. The shoulderblades are the scapular area and the breastbone is the sternal region. The abdominal area is the region between the chest and the pelvis. The breast is called the mamma or mammary, the armpit as the axilla and axillary, and the navel as the umbilicus and umbilical. The pelvis is the lower torso, between the abdomen and the thighs. The groin, where the thigh joins the trunk, are the inguen and inguinal area.

The entire arm is referred to as the brachium and brachial, the front of the elbow as the antecubitis and antecubital, the back of the elbow as the olecranon or olecranal, the forearm as the antebrachium and antebrachial, the wrist as the carpus and carpal area, the hand as the manus and manual, the palm as the palma and palmar, the thumb as the pollex, and the fingers as the digits, phalanges, and phalangeal. The buttocks are the gluteus or gluteal region and the pubic area is the pubis.

Anatomists divide the lower limb into the thigh (the part of the limb between the hip and the knee) and the leg (which refers only to the area of the limb between the knee and the ankle). The thigh is the femur and the femoral region. The kneecap is the patella and patellar while the back of the knee is the popliteus and popliteal area. The leg (between the knee and the ankle) is the crus and crural area, the lateral aspect of the leg is the peroneal area, and the calf is the sura and sural region. The ankle is the tarsus and tarsal, and the heel is the calcaneus or calcaneal. The foot is the pes and pedal region, and the sole of the foot the planta and plantar. As with the fingers, the toes are also called the digits, phalanges, and phalangeal area. The big toe is referred to as the hallux.

See also 
 List of human anatomical parts named after people
 List of regions in the human brain
 Surface anatomy

References